The Breeders 2YO Colt & Gelding Pace is a harness racing event for two-year-old Standardbred male pacers. It is one part of the Breeders Crown annual series of twelve races for both Standardbred pacers and trotters. First run in 1985, it is contested over a distance of one mile. Race organizers have awarded the event to various racetracks across North America. The 2017 race will be held at Hoosier Park in Anderson, Indiana, United States.

Historical race events
In the October 12, 1984 inaugural running of the Breeders Crown pace for two-year-old males, Dragon's Lair scored what is widely regarded as one of the most memorable wins in the series history when he upset the previously undefeated Nihilator in a then world record time of 1:54 1/5.

In 2010, Pocono Downs became the first venue to host all 12 events on a single night.

North American Locations
Woodbine Racetrack (Wdb) Ontario (9)
Meadowlands Racetrack (Mxx) New Jersey (6)
Pompano Park (Ppk) Florida (5)
Mohawk Raceway (Moh) Ontario (4)
Garden State Park (Gsp) New Jersey (2)
Pocono Downs (Pcd) Pennsylvania (2)
Rosecroft Raceway (Rcr) Maryland (2)
Colonial Downs (Cln) Virginia (1) 
Freehold Raceway (Fhl) New Jersey (1)
The Meadows Racetrack (Mea) Pennsylvania (1)

Records
 Most wins by a driver
 6 – Ronald Pierce (1998, 2003, 2004, 2008, 2009, 2013)

 Most wins by a trainer
 3 –   Robert McIntosh (1986, 1997, 2001)

 Stakes record
 1:49 0/0 – Sweet Lou (2011)

Winners of the Breeders Crown 2YO Colt & Gelding Pace

See also
List of Breeders Crown Winners

External links
YouTube video titled "Meadows 50th: Dragon's Lair"

References

Recurring sporting events established in 1984
Harness racing in the United States
Harness racing in Canada
Breeders Crown
Racing series for horses
Horse races in Florida
Horse races in New Jersey
Horse races in Maryland
Horse races in Ontario
Horse races in Pennsylvania
Horse races in Virginia